Richmond Township may refer to the following places in the U.S. state of Michigan:

 Richmond Township, Macomb County, Michigan
 Richmond Township, Marquette County, Michigan
 Richmond Township, Osceola County, Michigan

See also 
 Richmond, Michigan, Macomb County
 New Richmond, Michigan, Allegan County
 Richmond Township (disambiguation)
 Richmond (disambiguation)
 Richfield Township, Michigan (disambiguation)
 Richland Township, Michigan (disambiguation)

Michigan township disambiguation pages